The Battle for Marjah is an HBO documentary written, filmed and produced by Ben Anderson, covering the efforts of Bravo Company, 1st Battalion, 6th Marine Regiment of the US military in Operation Moshtarak.

References

External links

Documentary films about the War in Afghanistan (2001–2021)
HBO documentary films
2010 films
2010s American films